Phainantha is a small genus of herbaceous climbers restricted to South America. It is a disjunct genus containing five species, four of which are found in the Guyana Shield tepuyes region while the fifth is endemic to the Cordillera del Condor in Ecuador.

Species
 Phainantha laxiflora (Triana) Gleason
 Phainantha maguirei Wurdack
 Phainantha myrteoloides Wurdack
 Phainantha shuariorum C.Ulloa & D.A.Neill
 Phainantha steyermarkii Wurdack

References

Melastomataceae
Melastomataceae genera
Flora of the Tepuis